Dennis Kelly (died 1758) was Chief Justice of Jamaica in 1742. He was one of five brothers from Lisduff, County Galway who emigrated from Ireland to Jamaica in the 18th century. His only legitimate daughter, Elizabeth, was heiress to, the Kelly estates there, and in 1752 married Peter Browne, 2nd Earl of Altamont. Denis Kelly's illegitimate daughter, Priscilla Kelly, married Robert Cooper Lee, Crown Solicitor-General of Jamaica, and Barrister of London, England. Their heiress daughter, Favell Bourke Lee, married David Bevan, British banker of Barclay, Bevan, Bennin, Tritton (forerunners of Barclays Bank DCO). This united several of Britain's aristocratic families.

Footnotes

References 

Chief justices of Jamaica
Year of birth missing
1758 deaths
Irish slave owners
18th-century Jamaican judges